Svetlana Stanislavovna Smirnova (born 25 April 1956) is a Soviet and Russian film and stage actress. She was made a People's Artist of Russia in 2005. She is notable for works including A Glass of Water (1979).

Biography
At the end of 1977, after the Leningrad State Institute of Theatre, Music and Cinematography, Smirnova worked in the Bryantsev Youth Theatre, she played in productions of Bambi, The Comedy of Errors, Open Lesson, and others. 

In 1981-1982, she also worked at Lenfilm Studio Theatre "Time". From 1983 to 1986 she acted at Lensovet Theater in St Petersburg, and until 1992 at the Salon Theater Saint Petersburg, before moving to the troupe of Pushkin.

Selected filmography
 A Glass of Water (Стакан воды, 1979) as Abigail Churchill
 The Twentieth Century Approaches (Двадцатый век начинается, 1986) as Violet Westberry
 Dead Man's Letters (Письма мёртвого человека, 1986) as Theresa
 The Prisoner of Château d'If (Узник замка Иф, 1988)  as Hermine Danglar
 The Lady with the parrot (Дама с попугаем, 1988)  as Elena Stepantsova
 The Life of Klim Samgin (Жизнь Клима Самгина, 1988) as Varvara Varfolomeevna Antipova
 Streets of Broken Lights (Улицы разбитых фонарей, 1998–present) as Larisa Vasilyevna Serdobolskaya
 Russian Ark (Русский ковчег, 2002)

External links

Светлана Смирнова на сайте Александринского театра

1956 births
Living people
Actresses from Saint Petersburg
Soviet film actresses
Soviet television actresses
Soviet stage actresses
Russian film actresses
Russian television actresses
Russian stage actresses
People's Artists of Russia
Russian State Institute of Performing Arts alumni